Sir Simon Keenlyside  (born 3 August 1959) is a British baritone who has performed in operas and concerts since the mid-1980s.

Biography

Early life and education
Keenlyside was born in London, the son of Raymond and Ann Keenlyside. Raymond played second violin in the Aeolian Quartet, and Ann's father was the violinist Leonard Hirsch. When he was eight, he was enrolled in St John's College School, a boarding school for the boy choristers of the Choir of St John's College, Cambridge and spent much of his childhood touring and recording with the choir under the direction of choirmaster George Guest.

He later attended Reed's School in Cobham, before studying zoology at Cambridge University. He returned to St John's as a choral scholar, before studying singing at the Royal Northern College of Music in Manchester. After graduation, he won a Peter Moores Foundation scholarship (1985) and joined the Royal Northern College of Music to study voice with the baritone John Cameron where he developed a love for lieder and German poetry.

Singing career
Keenlyside made his first appearance in a major operatic role in 1987 as Lescaut in Manon Lescaut at the Royal Northern College of Music. Opera magazine remarked on it being an "astonishingly mature" performance, and that he "used his warm and clear baritone with notable musicianship". The Richard Tauber prize, which he won in 1986, allowed him to go to Salzburg for further study. His money ran out before he could finish his four-month term there, but Rudolf Knoll, a teacher at the Salzburg Mozarteum, gave him private lessons for free. Knoll encouraged him to work on the Italian repertoire while he was still young, and introduced him to the Hilbert agency which got him singing jobs in Germany. His professional debut as a baritone came in 1988, at the Hamburg State Opera as Count Almaviva in The Marriage of Figaro.

In 1989, Keenlyside joined the roster of Scottish Opera, where he stayed until 1994, performing as, among other roles, Marcello (La bohème), Danilo (The Merry Widow), Harlequin (Ariadne auf Naxos), Guglielmo (Così fan tutte), Figaro (Barber of Seville), Billy Budd (Billy Budd), Papageno (Zauberflöte) and Belcore (L'elisir d'amore).

During this period, he made debut performances at the Royal Opera House at Covent Garden, (1989 singing Silvio), English National Opera (Guglielmo), Welsh National Opera, San Francisco Opera, Geneva, Paris, and Sydney. He sang for Glyndebourne for the first time in 1993 and made his debut at the Metropolitan Opera in New York in 1996. Keenlyside has performed at virtually all the major opera houses in the world, including the Paris Opera and the Metropolitan Opera.

Keenlyside sang in the world premieres of two 21st-century operas, creating the roles of Prospero in Thomas Adès' The Tempest in 2004, and Winston Smith in Lorin Maazel's 1984 in 2005. He later participated in the EMI Classics world premiere recording of The Tempest.

In 2010 Keenlyside sang the role of Rodrigo in a new production of Don Carlo at the Metropolitan Opera opposite Roberto Alagna to critical acclaim.

Keenlyside added the role of Golaud in Debussy's Pelléas et Mélisande to his repertoire in a new production which premiered at Wiener Staatsoper on 18 June 2017 (he previously sang the role of Pelléas for many years).  The following afternoon, he was awarded the title of Kammersänger by the Austrian government in a ceremony in the Teesalon of the opera house.

His recordings include several issues for Hyperion Records, including music of Benjamin Britten, Emmanuel Chabrier, Maurice Duruflé and Henry Purcell. He is also a featured singer on five volumes of the Hyperion Franz Schubert Edition and on the second volume of the Hyperion Robert Schumann Edition. In 2007 Sony Music released a recital disc of arias entitled Tales of Opera.

Personal life
Keenlyside is married to the Royal Ballet dancer Zenaida Yanowsky. After being knighted in 2018, Yanowsky is entitled to the courtesy title Lady Keenlyside.

Operatic roles

Winston Smith in 1984
Harlequin in Ariadne auf Naxos
Ubalde in Armide
Figaro and Fiorello in The Barber of Seville
Billy Budd and Donald in Billy Budd
Marcello and Schaunard in La bohème
Catechiste in Briséïs
Mercurio in La Calisto
Olivier in Capriccio
Morales in Carmen
Dandini in La Cenerentola
Guglielmo in Così fan tutte
Abayaldos in Dom Sébastien
Posa and Flemish Deputy in Don Carlos
Don Giovanni in Don Giovanni
Belcore in L'elisir d'amore
Onegin in Eugene Onegin
Ford in Falstaff
Valentin and Wagner in Faust
Prisoner in Fidelio
Falke in Die Fledermaus
Hamlet in Ambroise Thomas' Hamlet
Oreste in Iphigénie en Tauride
Macbeth in Macbeth
Gendarme/Le directeur in Les Mamelles de Tirésias
Lescaut in Manon Lescaut
Count Almaviva in The Marriage of Figaro
Nightwatchman in Die Meistersinger von Nürnberg
Danilo in The Merry Widow
Orfeo in Monteverdi's L'Orfeo, favola in musica
Montano in Verdi's Otello
Silvio in Pagliacci
Pelléas in Pelléas et Mélisande
Golaud in Pelléas et Mélisande
Ned Keene in Peter Grimes
Prince Yeletski in The Queen of Spades
Tarquinius in The Rape of Lucretia
Rigoletto in Rigoletto
Arthus in Le Roi Arthus
Wolfram in Tannhäuser
Prospero in The Tempest
Giorgio Germont in Traviata
Steersman in Tristan und Isolde
Ping in Turandot
Andrei in Prokofiev's War and Peace
Wozzeck in Wozzeck
Papageno in Die Zauberflöte

Honours and awards

1986: Richard Tauber Prize 
1987: Winner of the Walther Gruner International Lieder competition
1990: First Prize, Elly Ameling competition
1994: Singer of the Year Award from the Royal Philharmonic Society
2003: Appointed Commander of the Order of the British Empire (CBE) in the Birthday Honours for services to Music
2004: Opera Award for the category Best Baritone (Don Giovanni, Théâtre de la Monnaie) from the Italian magazine L'Opera.
2004: XII Premios de la Crítica award to Simon Keenlyside and Natalie Dessay in Hamlet for the best male and female singers in a staged opera.
2005: Grammy Award for Best Opera Recording Marriage of Figaro
2006: Laurence Olivier Award for Outstanding Achievement in Opera, for his work in the ROH production of 1984 and ENO's Billy Budd in 2005. He was a nominee for this award in 2004 for The Royal Opera's Hamlet and Die Zauberflote.
2007: ECHO Klassik Award, Singer of the Year (male)
2007: XV Premios de la Crítica award for Best Recital Artist
 2007: Gramophone Award, Best of Category (Recital) for his debut recital album Tales of Opera
 2010: Gramophone Award, Best of Category (Contemporary) for the CD The Tempest, singing Prospero
 2011: Musical America's Vocalist of the Year award
 2017: Austrian Kammersänger
 2018: Knighted in the 2018 Birthday Honours for services to Music

References

External links
simonkeenlyside.info – Biography, schedule, discography, media database
Television interview with Simon Keenlyside on C Music TV
Simon Keenlyside on Askonas Holt Artists' Management

1959 births
20th-century British  male opera singers
21st-century British male opera singers
Alumni of St John's College, Cambridge
Alumni of the Royal Northern College of Music
Commanders of the Order of the British Empire
English operatic baritones
Fellows of St John's College, Cambridge
Living people
People educated at Reed's School
Singers from London
Grammy Award winners
Knights Bachelor
Österreichischer Kammersänger
Singers awarded knighthoods